This is the list of the Lebanese government that was formed by Fouad Siniora on 11 July 2008. In the cabinet, the opposition had eleven of the thirty seats.

Composition

References

Sources
National Unity Government

2008 establishments in Lebanon
2009 disestablishments in Lebanon
Cabinets of Lebanon
Cabinets established in 2008
Cabinets disestablished in 2009